King James may refer to:

Monarchs

Scottish
 James I of Scotland (1394–1437), nominal King of Scots from 1406 and reigned 1424–1437
 James II of Scotland (1430–1460), King of Scots 1437–1460
 James III of Scotland (1451–1488), King of Scots 1460–1488
 James IV of Scotland (1473–1513), King of Scots 1488–1513
 James V of Scotland (1512–1542), nominal King of Scots from 1513 and reigned 1528–1542

English and Scottish
 James VI and I (1566–1625), sponsor of the eponymous Bible translation, reigned as King James VI of Scotland and King James I of England and Ireland
 James II of England (1633–1701), reigned as King James VII of Scotland and King James II of England and Ireland
 James Francis Edward Stuart (1688–1766), Jacobite pretender

Spanish
 James I of Aragon (1208–1276), surnamed the Conqueror, was the king of Aragon, count of Barcelona and Lord of Montpellier from 1213 to 1276
 James II of Aragon (1267–1327), called The Just (Catalan: El Just) was the second son of Peter III of Aragon and Constance of Sicily
 James II of Majorca (died 1311)
 James III of Majorca (1315–1349), last ruler of independent Majorca
 James IV of Majorca (1336–1375)

People nicknamed or under the pseudonym "King James"
 James Strang (1813–1856), founder of the Strangite Church of Jesus Christ of Latter Day Saints, who was crowned king of Beaver Island in Lake Michigan
 LeBron James (born 1984), American basketball player

Songs
"King James", a song on the 2006 album Crime Slunk Scene by Buckethead about the basketball player LeBron James
"King James", a song from Filmworks II: Music for an Untitled Film by Walter Hill by John Zorn
"King James" (M.I song), 2014
"King James", a single from Anderson Paak's 2019 album Ventura

Christianity
The Authorized King James Version of the Bible
See King James Version (disambiguation) for other variants

Other
, a number of ships with this name
King James (band), a Christian metal/rock supergroup formed in 1993
 King James (horse), an American Thoroughbred racehorse

See also
King James Academy (disambiguation)
King James's School (disambiguation)
James King (disambiguation)
James (disambiguation)
King (disambiguation)
KJ (disambiguation)

James